The Authors' Club Best First Novel Award is awarded by the Authors' Club to the most promising first novel of the year, written by a British author and published in the UK during the calendar year preceding the year in which the award is presented.

It has been awarded to the following:

This list is incomplete

1954 - David Unwin - The Governor's Wife
1955 - Brian Moore - Judith Hearne (later republished as The Lonely Passion of Judith Hearne)
1956 - Harry Bloom - Episode
1957 - Edmund Ward - Summer in Retreat
1958 - Alan Sillitoe - Saturday Night and Sunday Morning
1959 - David Caute - At Fever Pitch
1960 - Lionel Davidson - The Night of Wenceslas
1961 - Jim Hunter - The Sun in the Morning
1962 - John Pearson - Gone to Timbuctoo
1963 - David Rubin - The Greater Darkness
1964 - Robin Douglas-Home - Hot for Certainties
1965 - James Mossman - Beggars on Horseback
1966 - Leslie Thomas - The Virgin Soldiers
1967 - Paul Bailey - At the Jerusalem
1968 - Barry England - Figures in a Landscape
1969 - Peter Tinniswood - A Touch of Daniel
1970 - Rachel Ingalls - Theft
1971 - Rosemary Hawley Jarman - We Speak No Treason
1973 - Jennifer Johnston - The Captains and the Kings
1975 - Sasha Moorsom - A Lavender Trip
1977 - Barbara Benson - The Underlings
1978 - Katharine Gordon - The Emerald Peacock
1979 - Martin Page - The Pilate Plot
1980 - Dawn Lowe-Watson - The Good Morrow
1981 - Anne Smith - The Magic Glass
1982 - Frances Vernon - Privileged Children
1983 - Katherine Moore - Summer at the Haven
1984 - Frederick R. Hyde-Chambers - Lama: A Novel of Tibet
1985 - Magda Sweetland - Eightsome Reel
1986 - Helen Harris - Playing Fields in Winter
1987 - Peter Benson - The Levels
1988 - Gilbert Adair - The Holy Innocents
1989 - Lindsey Davis - The Silver Pigs 
1990 - Alan Brownjohn - The Way You Tell Them
1991 - Zina Rohan - The Book of Wishes and Complaints 
1992 - David Park - The Healing 
1993 - Nadeem Aslam - Season of the Rainbirds 
1994 - Andrew Cowan - Pig
1995 - T. J. Armstrong - Walter and the Resurrection of G
1996 - Diran Adebayo - Some Kind of Black and Rhidian Brook - The Testimony of Taliesin Jones (shared)
1997 - Mick Jackson - The Underground Man
1998 - Jackie Kay - Trumpet
1999 - Ann Harries - Manly Pursuits
2000 - Brian Clarke - The Stream
2001 - Carl Tighe - Burning Worm
2002 - Ben Facini - The Water Breather
2003 - Dan Rhodes - Timoleon Vieta Come Home
2004 - Susan Fletcher - Eve Green and Neil Griffiths - Betrayal in Naples (shared)
2005 - Henry Shukman - Sandstorm
2006 - Nicola Monaghan - The Killing Jar 
2007 - Segun Afolabi - Goodbye Lucille
2009 - Laura Beatty - Pollard
2010 - Anthony Quinn - The Rescue Man
2011 - Jonathan Kemp - London Triptych
2012 - Kevin Barry - City of Bohane
2013 - Ros Barber - The Marlowe Papers and I. J. Kay - Mountains of the Moon
2014 - Jack Wolf - The Tale of Raw Head and Bloody Bones
2015 - Carys Bray - A Song for Issy Bradley
2016 -  Benjamin Johncock - The Last Pilot
2017 - Rowan Hisayo Buchanan - Harmless Like You
2019 - Guy Gunaratne - In Our Mad and Furious City
2020 - Claire Adam - Golden Child 
2021 - Ingrid Persaud - Love after Love
2022 - Tish Delaney - Before my Actual Heart Breaks

References

First book awards
English literary awards
British fiction awards
Awards established in 1954
1954 establishments in the United Kingdom